Megalonycta mediovitta is a moth of the family Noctuidae first described by Walter Rothschild in 1924. The species is found in Madagascar, the Comoros and Réunion.

References
Rothschild (1924). "Some new or noteworthy Madagascar and African Heterocera". Annals and Magazine of Natural History. (9) 14: 308.

External links
drlegrain.be: Pictures of Megalonycta mediovitta

Moths described in 1924
Hadeninae
Moths of Madagascar
Moths of the Comoros
Moths of Réunion